The Hatf IX ("Vengeance IX") or Nasr, is a solid fueled tactical ballistic missile system developed by the National Development Complex (NDC) of Pakistan.

The ISPR described the system as a "Multi-tube Ballistic Missile" because the launch vehicle carries multiple missiles. Its existence was revealed after a test in 2011 and it appears to have entered service after further testing in 2013.

Background
According to defence analysts and missile technology experts the system appears to have been developed as a "low-yield battlefield deterrent" targeted at "mechanized forces like armed brigades and divisions."  Therefore, it is believed by analysts that the system is deployed to deter and respond to India's "Cold Start" doctrine. The military ISPR maintains that the Hatf IX was developed to "add deterrence value... at shorter ranges... with high accuracy, shoot and scoot attributes" for "quick response."

Pakistan confirmed that these tactical nuclear weapons are intended to be used against Indian troops on Pakistani soil. According to analysts, if used just inside Pakistani territory, it would counter the cold start doctrine and maximize ionizing radiation exposure while minimizing blast effects which would be more dangerous for the Indian army than for local people as the blast yield is much lower than strategic nuclear weapons.

Design
Four missiles are carried on the same Chinese-origin 8x8 transporter erector launcher (TEL) as the Pakistan Army's A-100E 300mm Multiple Launch Rocket System (MLRS), a Chinese version of the BM-30 Smerch.

Capabilities
The missile can carry nuclear warheads of appropriate yield with high accuracy. Pakistan has claimed that it was designed to overcome missile defense systems. It is also claimed that this missile is accurate. In one of the released test fire footage; the Nasr missile can be seen hitting a target with pinpoint accuracy. However actual figures of the CEP have not been disclosed. Mansoor Ahmed, of Quaid-e-Azam University’s Department of Defence and Strategic Studies claimed: "Its in-flight maneuverability is being improved to defeat potential Indian missile defenses against artillery rockets and short-range ballistic missiles, such as the Israeli Iron Dome system." He further went on to say that the system is "fully integrated into the centralized command-and-control structure through round the clock situational awareness in a digitized network centric environment to the decision makers at National Command Center. Nasr is obviously India-specific and the salvo launch capability is a key ability in stopping Indian armored thrusts into Pakistani territory."

History 
The missile's existence was first reported after a test-firing on 19-April-2011. A 4-missile salvo fired on 5 October 2013 is believed to have marked the conclusion of the testing programme and the system's likely entry into service. An extended range  missile was tested recently.

See also 
Similar missiles
 Prahaar (missile)
 MGR-1 Honest John
 KN-25

References

External links
CSIS Missile Threat - Hatf 9

Related lists
 List of missiles of Pakistan

Nuclear missiles of Pakistan
Ballistic missiles of Pakistan
Surface-to-surface missiles of Pakistan
Tactical ballistic missiles of Pakistan
Guided missiles of Pakistan
Theatre ballistic missiles
Military equipment introduced in the 2010s